Eby is an unincorporated community in Hart Township, Warrick County, in the U.S. state of Indiana.

History
A post office was established at Eby in 1870, and remained in operation until it was discontinued in 1903. According to Ronald L. Baker, the community was probably named for a local resident. A Warrick County soldier named Abraham Eby was killed in the Civil War.

Geography

Notes

Unincorporated communities in Indiana
Unincorporated communities in Warrick County, Indiana